Ali Khel is a village in Jalandhar. Jalandhar is a district in the Indian state of Punjab.

About 
Ali Khel lies on the Kartarpur-Bhogpur road.  The nearest railway station to Ali Khel is Kartarpur railway station at a distance of 3 km.

Post code 
Ali Khel's post office is Kartarpur whose post code is 144801.

References 

 A Punjabi site with Ali Khel's details

Villages in Jalandhar district